The teams that participate in the National Collegiate Athletic Association's Division I Football Bowl Subdivision earn the right to compete in a series of post-season games called bowl games. As of 2022, there are 42 bowl games (not counting the College Football Playoff National Championship), and all are contractually obligated to offer bids to specific conferences, a situation known as a "tie-in".  The "top" six bowl games ("New Year's Six") in the nation select their teams as part of the College Football Playoff (CFP), which was put into place for a minimum of 12 years, beginning with the 2014 season. Prior to 2014, the top five games in the country were chosen under the system known as the Bowl Championship Series. The bowls outside of the CFP have individual contracts with the conferences to offer preferential bids to teams from those conferences.  As long as teams are bowl eligible, they may be selected by these bowls to meet these contracts.

College Football Playoff

The College Football Playoff consists of seven bowls: the Rose Bowl, Sugar Bowl, Orange Bowl, Cotton Bowl, Fiesta Bowl, Peach Bowl, and the College Football Playoff National Championship.  For the 2022-23 season, the Fiesta Bowl and the Peach Bowl will serve as national semifinals for the 2023 College Football Playoff National Championship in Los Angeles, California, meaning that the teams ranked #1 through #4 in the final College Football playoff rankings will play in those two bowls, with the winners advancing to the CFP National Championship. 

Twelve schools are selected for the major bowls.  These include the champions of the Atlantic Coast Conference, the Big Ten Conference, Big 12 Conference,  Pac-12 Conference and Southeastern Conference.  The highest-ranked champion from the "Group of Five" conferences (American Athletic Conference, Conference USA, MAC, Mountain West, and Sun Belt) is guaranteed a berth if the group's top team is not in the playoff.

The following tie-ins exist for bowls in the years they are not hosting the national semifinals:

 Rose Bowl — Big Ten #1 vs. Pac-12 #1
 Sugar Bowl — SEC #1 vs. Big 12 #1
 Orange Bowl — ACC #1 vs. SEC #2, Big Ten #2, or Notre Dame
 Cotton Bowl — at-large or "Group of Five" (committee selection)
 Fiesta Bowl — at-large or "Group of Five" (committee selection)
 Peach Bowl — at-large or "Group of Five" (committee selection)

2022-23  "New Year's Six" bowl games

*The top Group of Five champion will be placed into one of the At-Large spots, if they are not selected to be in the CFP.

Bowl Championship Series

From 1998 to 2013, the national champion was determined on the field by the Bowl Championship Series.  The Bowl Championship Series consisted of five games, the Rose Bowl, Fiesta Bowl, Orange Bowl, and Sugar Bowl, as well as the BCS Championship Game.  A composite system of computer rankings and human polls was used to rank the teams in the Division I–Football Bowl Subdivision.  As with the College Football Playoff, the BCS consisted the champions of major conferences, at-large teams, and occasionally Notre Dame or teams from mid-major conferences. Consideration was given to historic associations between the conferences and the bowl games themselves.  Tie-ins still apply, unless a team obligated to a certain bowl game is selected for the BCS Championship Game.

Other Bowl Games in 2022
The bowls that are not part of the CFP have contractual ties to specific conferences.  For the 2019–20 bowl season, all bowls have at least two tie-ins, meaning that there are no at-large spots open in these bowls, assuming that all conferences produce enough bowl eligible teams.  Many bowls also have contingency contracts to offer spots to other specific conferences should their first choice not be eligible.  If any slot cannot be filled by a contracted conference at all, then the spot becomes open, and the bowl can offer the slot to any eligible team.

To be eligible, a team must have at least as many wins against FBS opponents as it has total losses in the regular season (excluding the conference championship game), except that a team may count one win against an FCS team that has given out at least 90% of its allowed scholarships over the past two years (as some FCS teams have defeated FBS teams, most notably in the major FCS conferences that typically are in the NCAA championship final).  There is one exception to this, as is the case with other sports that use a conference tournament; a conference champion is always eligible to play in a bowl game where the conference has a contract that requires its champion to play in that game.  The exclusion of conference championship games was added after UCLA, which was the Pac-12 South representative in 2011, was 6–6 and lost the conference championship game that they participated only because of USC, which won the division that year, was on NCAA probation.  The NCAA granted UCLA a waiver, and the exception appeared the following year, where the rule was used by Georgia Tech, the only eligible team among the three tied teams in the Coastal Division that was eligible for postseason because of NCAA probation, was also 6–6 and lost the conference championship game .)

If, as happened in 2015, there are more bowl game openings than eligible teams, then additional teams can become eligible.  They are divided up into four groups; all of the teams from a group must be chosen (or decline a bowl bid) before teams from the next group can be chosen.  The groups are:
 A team that does not have a "counted" win against an FCS team, but beat an FCS team that did not meet the 90% scholarship requirement, and would have been bowl eligible had that game counted.
 A team that plays 13 games in its regular season (excluding conference championship games, as that was previously referenced;  a 13th game is possible if a team plays at Hawaii) and has a 6–7 record, since six wins is normally bowl eligible.
 A team in the second year of an FCS to FBS transfer "probationary period" that would have been eligible had it been a full FBS member.
 If there are still bowl openings remaining, they are given to teams with a 5–7 record in order of their four-year football Academic Progress Rate (APR). 
Note that, in groups 1–3, the teams can be chosen in any order, and the bowl games choose the teams; however, in group 4, they must be chosen in APR order, and each team chooses the bowl game in which it will play.

A rule change for 2010 allows bowls to tender a bid to any team with a 6–6 record before teams with more than six wins.   Previously, a bowl with an at-large bid to fill was required to select the remaining team with the best record over a 6–6 team that would have been more financially attractive in terms of bringing more fans to the respective bowl.

Records vs. selection order
The contracts specify that the respective bowl committees receive a certain choice of teams. The selection order lists shown below (#1, #2, #3, etc.) indicate only the order in which the respective bowl committees make their selections. The choices are typically not predicated on end-of-season rankings or actually final regular season records/standings. For example, a bowl with the "# 3 pick" from a particular conference does not mean necessarily it has to select the "third place team" from that conference. When it becomes that committee's turn to pick, it may pick any of the remaining teams from that conference (with respect to the aforementioned eligibility rules detailed above).

A committee may select one team over another due to geographical proximity, travel ability for the fanbase, or other factors. Bowls may choose to "skip" teams in order to avoid regular season rematches, or perhaps bowl rematches from the previous season. In various cases, bowls have embraced a particular team(s) participating in same bowl in two consecutive seasons, but may shy away from inviting them for a third consecutive season. However, in most cases, the order loosely follows the general order of the regular season records/rankings.

Some conferences have special selection parameters written into their contracts with specific bowls — for example, the Citrus Bowl is contractually obligated to select the winningest Big Ten and SEC teams that do not make a CFP game (semifinal or New Year's Six Bowl), or a team within one win of the winningest in its conference. The MAC's bowl contracts require that both division champions, if eligible, receive bids to one of its five contracted bowls.

2022 Order of selection
Teams must be bowl-eligible to be selected for a bowl game.  Should a conference not have enough eligible teams to meet their obligations, the bowls at the end of the selection process are free to choose a replacement team from among any remaining bowl-eligible teams that are not already committed to a bowl game.
If a conference has multiple teams chosen for the CFP/New Year's Six games, the remaining bowls still select in the same order. For example, if two Pac-12 teams are in the CFP, the Alamo Bowl would then have the third (and not second) selection from the Pac-12, and all remaining bowls would also shift accordingly. This increases the likelihood that the conference will not be able to provide enough teams to meet its tie-in obligations.

American Athletic Conference 

2020-2025:

Guaranteed Bids:
 The Military Bowl
 The Fenway Bowl
 The Armed Forces Bowl (even years) or the Hawaii Bowl (odd years)
 The Independence Bowl (2022)

Four Bids from the following:
 The Birmingham Bowl
 The Gasparilla Bowl
 The First Responder Bowl
 The Boca Raton Bowl
 The Frisco Bowl
 The Cure Bowl
 The Myrtle Beach Bowl
 The New Mexico Bowl

Atlantic Coast Conference
2022: 

NOTE: Selections made with schools, bowls, and conference office, no order of selection outside of NY6 bowls, then tier #1 bowls, then tier #2 bowls

 #1 College Football Playoff. ACC Champion (if not selected for the playoff) goes to the Orange Bowl

Tier #1
 The Cheez-It Bowl versus Big 12
 The Gator Bowl versus SEC
 The Duke's Mayo Bowl versus SEC (odd-numbered years) or Big Ten (even-numbered years)
 The Sun Bowl versus Pac-12
 The Bad Boy Mowers Pinstripe Bowl versus Big Ten
 The Holiday Bowl versus Pac-12
 The Fenway Bowl versus the American Athletic
 The Military Bowl versus the American Athletic

Tier #2
 The Gasparilla Bowl versus SEC or AAC or Pac-12
 The Birmingham Bowl versus SEC or AAC
 The First Responder Bowl versus Big XII or C-USA or AAC

Big 12 Conference
2022:
 #1 College Football Playoff. The champion goes to the Sugar Bowl if not selected for playoffs. The Sugar Bowl gets filled by a Big 12 team if the champion is in the playoffs
 #2 The Alamo Bowl versus Pac-12.
 #3 The Cheez-It Bowl versus ACC.
 #4 The Texas Bowl versus SEC.
 #5 The Liberty Bowl versus SEC.
 #6 The Guaranteed Rate Bowl versus Big Ten #7.
 #7 The First Responder Bowl or Armed Forces Bowl

Big Ten Conference

2022:

 #1 College Football Playoff. Champion goes to Rose Bowl if not selected for playoffs. The Rose Bowl gets filled by a Big Ten team if champion is in the playoffs
 #2 The Citrus Bowl versus SEC
 #3 The ReliaQuest Bowl versus SEC 
 #4 The Duke's Mayo Bowl versus ACC (even-numbered years) or the Las Vegas Bowl versus Pac-12 (odd-numbered years)
 #5 The Music City Bowl versus SEC
 #6 The Bad Boy Mowers Pinstripe Bowl versus ACC
 #7 The Guaranteed Rate Bowl versus Big 12 #6
 #8 The Quick Lane Bowl versus MAC

Conference USA 

2022:

Guaranteed Bowl Bid
 The Bahamas Bowl versus MAC
 The New Orleans Bowl versus Sun Belt
 The Independence Bowl versus BYU
 The Hawaii Bowl versus MWC (even years)

C-USA will get 4 or 5 additional bowl bids from these 12 bowls (decision made in conjunction with ESPN, who owns these bowls):
 The LendingTree Bowl
 The Frisco Bowl
 The New Mexico Bowl
 The Gasparilla Bowl
 The First Responder Bowl
 The Boca Raton Bowl
 The Armed Forces Bowl
 The Birmingham Bowl
 The Camellia Bowl
 The Cure Bowl
 The Fenway Bowl
 The Myrtle Beach Bowl

Mid-American Conference

2022:

Guaranteed Bowl Bid:
 The Bahamas Bowl versus Conference USA
 The Famous Idaho Potato Bowl versus Mountain West
 The Arizona Bowl versus Mountain West
 The Quick Lane Bowl versus Big Ten

2 Bids from the following:
 The Boca Raton Bowl
 The Camellia Bowl
 The Cure Bowl
 The Frisco Bowl
 The LendingTree Bowl
 The Myrtle Beach Bowl
 The New Mexico Bowl

Mountain West Conference

2022:

 The LA Bowl versus Pac-12.
 The Famous Idaho Potato Bowl versus MAC.
 The New Mexico Bowl versus C-USA.
 The Arizona Bowl versus MAC.
 The Hawaii Bowl versus AAC or C-USA.

The Mountain West Conference will also have a sixth bowl tie-in with an ESPN Events operated bowl game.

As secondary if the listed conferences cannot provide a bowl-eligible team
 The Guaranteed Rate Bowl versus Big 12 or Big Ten

Pac-12 Conference
2022:

 #1 College Football Playoff. Champion goes to Rose Bowl unless they are selected for playoffs. The Rose Bowl gets filled by a Pac-12 team if the champion is in the playoffs.

Guaranteed Bids:

 The Alamo Bowl versus Big 12 #2.
 The Holiday Bowl versus ACC.
 The Las Vegas Bowl versus Big Ten #4.
 The Sun Bowl versus ACC.
 The LA Bowl versus Mountain West.

The Pac-12 Conference will also have a seventh bowl tie-in with an ESPN Events operated bowl game.

Southeastern Conference

2022

 #1 College Football Playoff. Champion goes to Sugar Bowl unless they are selected for playoffs. The Sugar Bowl gets filled by an SEC team if the champion is in the playoffs.
 #2 The Citrus Bowl versus Big Ten 

Tier #1:
Conference, in consultation with bowls and schools, assign teams to the following six bowls:
 The ReliaQuest Bowl versus Big Ten
 The Las Vegas Bowl versus Pac-12 (even-numbered years) OR the Duke's Mayo Bowl versus ACC (odd-numbered years)
 The Gator Bowl versus ACC
 The Music City Bowl versus Big Ten
 The Texas Bowl versus Big 12
 The Liberty Bowl versus Big 12

Tier #2
 The Birmingham Bowl
 The Gasparilla Bowl

Sun Belt Conference

2022

Guaranteed Bids:
 The New Orleans Bowl versus Conference USA 
 The LendingTree Bowl versus MAC 

3 Bids from the following:
 The Boca Raton Bowl The Camellia Bowl The Cure Bowl The Famous Idaho Potato Bowl The First Responder Bowl The Frisco Bowl The Myrtle Beach Bowl The New Mexico BowlDivision I FBS Independents
Of the independent Football Bowl Subdivision teams, there are contractual agreements to play in certain bowl games should they become bowl eligible.  All of these teams are eligible to be selected for a New Year's Six bowl game before accepting any other contractual bids.For 2022, some of the contractual obligations are the following:
 BYU – BYU has a deal with the Independence Bowl and (via ESPN) the Guaranteed Rate Bowl, but ended up being selected to the New Mexico Bowl
 Notre Dame – eligible for ACC-contracted bowls. However, Notre Dame cannot be selected by an ACC bowl if there is an eligible ACC team with two or more wins than Notre Dame. For example, a 9–3 Duke team must be chosen over a 7–5 Notre Dame team.  Notre Dame was selected to the 2019 Camping World Bowl in lieu of the 3rd-place ACC team, the third time since 2014 they have taken an ACC slot.   Notre Dame can also be selected to play against ACC teams in the Orange Bowl twice in the span from 2014-2025, and has no limit in playing in any other New Year's Six bowls if selected (Notre Dame has yet to make an Orange Bowl in that time; its most recent New Year's Six Bowl was the 2021 Rose Bowl).  In 2022, Notre Dame was selected to the Gator Bowl.
 Liberty, New Mexico State and UMass - eligible for a bowl game with 6 wins.  Liberty and UMass have no tie-ins to any particular bowl game, while NMSU may be selected to the Arizona Bowl in lieu of a Sun Belt team.  In 2022, Liberty was selected to the Boca Raton Bowl and New Mexico State was selected to the Quick Lane Bowl.

Division I FCS
For the only bowl game in the Football Championship Subdivision, the Celebration Bowl, the Southwestern Athletic Conference and Mid-Eastern Athletic Conference both have tie-ins. Each conference must send their champion to the game.

Division II
Lone Star Conference
The Lone Star Conference has tie-ins to two bowls: a mandatory tie-in with the C.H.A.M.P.S. Heart of Texas Bowl and optional slots in the Live United Bowl and Corsicana Bowl.

Mid-America Intercollegiate Athletics Association
The Mid-America Intercollegiate Athletics Association has tie-ins to three bowls: 
 Mineral Water Bowl: The MIAA must send its highest-ranked team not in the Division II tournament.
 Live United Bowl: The MIAA is one of two conferences (the other being the LSC) from which the bowl can draw its at-large team.
 Corsicana Bowl: The MIAA is one of three conferences from which the bowl can draw its teams. 

Great American Conference
The Great American Conference has two tie-ins:
 Live United Bowl: The GAC must send its highest-ranked team not in the Division II tournament.
 Corsicana Bowl: The GAC is one of three conferences (the others being the MIAA and LSC) from which the bowl can draw its teams.

Northern Sun Intercollegiate Conference
The Northern Sun Intercollegiate Conference has a tie-in with the Mineral Water Bowl and sends the highest-ranking team not in the tournament.

ReferencesNotes'''

Bids
Sports competitions bids